Ernst Haas  was a Swiss rower who competed in the 1928 Summer Olympics and won the silver medal as member of the Swiss team in coxed four.

References

External links
 

Year of birth missing
Possibly living people
Swiss male rowers
Olympic rowers of Switzerland
Rowers at the 1928 Summer Olympics
Olympic silver medalists for Switzerland
Olympic medalists in rowing
Medalists at the 1928 Summer Olympics
European Rowing Championships medalists